Sambhav Asambhav was a Hindi language Indian television series that premiered on Sony TV on 1 May 2003, is based on a Gujarati novel Sambhav Asambhav written by Harkisan Mehta. The story is based on the lives of who get caught in the vortex of reincarnation. The series was directed by known television director Anant Mahadevan, and was shot at various locations in Mumbai including Film City and Madh Island. The show ended on 23 October 2003. It used to air every Thursday.

Cast
 Sangeeta Ghosh as Maya Siddharth Nath
 Shakti Anand as Siddharth Nath
 Vikram Gokhale as Amar Nath
 Dimple Inamdar as Meera Amar Nath
 Pooja Ghai Rawal as Kanika
 Rajesh Kumar as Amar Nath
 Naresh Suri as Dr. Devdutt
 Rupa Divetia as Daya
 Sumukhi Pendse as Sheela
 Mukesh Rawal as Maya's Mama
 Mugdha Shah as Maya's Mami
 Anil Dhawan as Manmohan
 Ghanashyam Nayak as Swami

References

External links
Sambhav Asambhav Official Site on Sony Entertainment Network
Preety Bhalla - Professional Singer

Sony Entertainment Television original programming
Indian drama television series